William Albert Rhodes (December 29, 1916 - January 22, 2007) was an astronomer and inventor who developed a novel method for the production of oxyhydrogen – initially called "Rhodes' Gas" after the inventor.

Early life
Rhodes was born in Garden City, Kansas on December 29, 1916 to George E. and Bertha G. Rhodes. 
Rhodes graduated from Georgetown and was awarded an honorary science doctorate by Columbia University.

Career
In 1929, he moved from Fort Collins, Colorado, where he studied music, to Phoenix, Arizona.   In 1936, Rhodes attended a meeting of The Society for Research of Meteorites.  In 1939, he married Doris Fern Browning;  At that time, he was a musician known professionally as "Wee Willie" and an instructor at the Institute of Educational Music.   In 1940,   Rhodes was profiled by The Arizona Republic after he created a radio-controlled model plane.  In 1941, Rhodes was profiled after he spent four months constructing a telescope.  [

In 1947, Rhodes announced he had photographed a UFO over his house—the photos were published in The Arizona Republic.

In 1949, Rhodes authored a letter to the editor over a matter involving the city's garbage dumps.  That same year,  Rhodes was visited by a friend and colleague, inventor Lee de Forest;  The visit was the subject of an article in The Arizona Republic.

In 1950, Rhodes again photographed an unidentified object, this time through a high-powered telescope.  In 1951, Rhodes constructed a 16-inch portable telescope which was featured in the local paper.  In October 1951, Rhodes reported the theft of a lethal load of radium-bromide from his home laboratory;  The lead-lined container, still holding the radium, was discovered the following day.

In 1952, Rhodes was mentioned in the magazine Popular Mechanics for his recent invention of a TV light amplifier. In 1952, Rhodes was featured in Newsweek magazine for this TV work.

In July 1952, Rhodes again featured in the Republic which described him as an "amateur astronomer and professional electronics engineer";  Rhodes and fellow amateur astronomer Harry E. Lang speculated that saucer reports might be linked to the proximity of the planet Mars.  In 1955, he participated in an exhibition of solar-powered machines; Rhodes constructed a device which used solar power to create hydraulic pressure.  In 1956, Rhodes and others formed the "Institute for Advanced Research".

In 1958, Rhodes authored a letter to the editor, objecting to a recent high court ruling against individuals practicing architecture without a license;   Rhodes argued that "police powers of this state are being used to protect the vaunted who who, like most of us human beings, dislike competition." 
Also in 1958, Rhodes was profiled after building a bomb shelter.

In 1957, Rhodes again was consulted by the Arizona Republic, where he debunked a recent unidentified sightings – Rhodes explained the object was a first magnitude star.

In August 1959, he authored a letter comparing Socialism and Communism.

In 1960, Rhodes helped the Republic work out schedules for when the US satellite Echo 1 would be visible from Phoenix.   In 1960, after local skywatchers reported an unidentified light,  Rhodes explained that the object, which he viewed through his telescope, appeared to be a Sabre jet. 
In 1961, Rhodes helped develop a heat detection device for local firefighters.  In 1962, Rhodes applied for (and later received) a patent for an invention concerning the electrolytic production of oxyhydrogen – initially called "Rhodes' Gas" and later "Brown's Gas".

Personal life and death
In 1935,  he was sued for divorce by Bertha Rivers. In 1939, he married Doris Fern Browning.    
In 1959, Rhodes authored a tribute to his recently deceased wife Maxine.
In 1959, Rhodes married Eileen Tremble Baker.
In 1980, he married Nancy Virginia Ross, they remained married until his death.

William Albert Rhodes died on January 22, 2007.

References

1916 births
2007 deaths
American inventors